The men's artistic individual all-around competition at the 1936 Summer Olympics was held at the Waldbühne on 10 and 11 August. It was the ninth appearance of the event. There were 111 competitors from 14 nations, with each nation sending up to 8 competitors. The event was won by Alfred Schwarzmann of Germany, the nation's first victory in the men's individual all-around. Germany also received bronze, with Konrad Frey taking third. Silver went to Switzerland's Eugen Mack.

Background

This was the ninth appearance of the men's individual all-around. The first individual all-around competition had been held in 1900, after the 1896 competitions featured only individual apparatus events. A men's individual all-around has been held every Games since 1900.

Nine of the top 10 gymnasts from the 1932 Games returned: gold medalist Romeo Neri of Italy, silver medalist István Pelle of Hungary, bronze medalist Heikki Savolainen of Finland, fifth-place finisher Savino Guglielmetti of Italy, sixth-place finisher Frank Haubold of the United States, seventh-place finisher Oreste Capuzzo of Italy, eighth-place finisher Fred Meyer of the United States, ninth-place finisher Mauri Nyberg-Noroma of Finland, and tenth-place finisher Al Jochim of the United States. Neri, Nyberg-Noroma, and Savolainen had all been in the top 10 in 1928 as well. The reigning (1934) World Champion was Eugen Mack of Switzerland, with Nero second and Emanuel Löffler of Czechoslovakia third.

Austria, Bulgaria, and Romania each made their debut in the event. Italy made its eighth appearance, most among nations, having missed only the 1904 Games in St. Louis.

Competition format

The gymnastics format returned to the aggregation format used in 1928 but not in 1932. Each nation entered a team of eight gymnasts (Bulgaria had only 7). Scores for each exercise were on a scale of 0 to 10. All entrants in the gymnastics competitions performed both a compulsory exercise and a voluntary exercise, with the scores summed to give a final total for each apparatus of up to 20. The scores in each of the six apparatus competitions were added together to give individual all-around scores (up to 120); the top six individual scores on each team were summed to give a team all-around score (up to 720). No separate finals were contested.

Schedule

There were two sessions each day. Nations assigned to one session on Day 1 as follows:
 Day 1 morning: Austria, Bulgaria, Finland, Hungary, Japan, United States, Yugoslavia
 Day 1 afternoon: Czechoslovakia, France, Germany Italy, Luxembourg, Romania, Switzerland

On day 2, the assignments were based on the standings for the team event with the leading nations going in the later session:
 Day 2 morning: Austria, Bulgaria, France, Hungary, Italy, Japan, Luxembourg, Romania, United States, Yugoslavia
 Day 2 afternoon: Czechoslovakia, Finland, Germany, Switzerland

Results

Romeo Neri, the individual all-around champion from the previous 1932 Summer Olympics, injured himself during the competition and finished last.

References

Men's artistic individual all-around
1936
Men's events at the 1936 Summer Olympics